The 2015 Hong Kong ATP Challenger was a professional tennis tournament played on hard courts. It was the first edition of the tournament which was part of the 2015 ATP Challenger Tour. It took place in Hong Kong, between 27 January and 1 February 2015.

Singles main draw entrants

Seeds

 1 Rankings are as of January 19, 2015.

Other entrants
The following players received wildcards into the singles main draw:
  Ho Chih Jen
  Hei Yin Andrew Li
  Philipp Petzschner
  Sanam Singh

The following players received entry from the qualifying draw:
  Bai Yan
  Gong Maoxin
  Toshihide Matsui
  Christopher Rungkat

Champions

Singles

 Kyle Edmund def.  Tatsuma Ito 6–1, 6–2

Doubles

 Hsieh Cheng-peng /  Yi Chu-huan def.  Saketh Myneni /  Sanam Singh 6–4, 6–2

Hong Kong ATP Challenger
Hong Kong ATP Challenger
Hong Kong ATP Challenger
2015 in Chinese tennis